Dzhil may refer to:
 Jil, Armenia
 Cil, Azerbaijan